"In a Darkened Room" is a song by Skid Row. It was a single from their second album, Slave to the Grind. The song was released in 1991 and written by bandmates Sebastian Bach, Rachel Bolan and Dave "the Snake" Sabo. The song only charted in Switzerland at number 27.

The song features a music video.

Track listing
 "In a Darkened Room"
 "Beggar's Day"
 "C'Mon and Love Me" (originally performed by KISS)

Charts

References

Skid Row (American band) songs
1991 singles
Songs written by Dave Sabo
Songs written by Rachel Bolan
Heavy metal ballads
Rock ballads
1991 songs
Atlantic Records singles